The 2016–17 Southeastern Conference women's basketball season began with practices in October 2016, followed by the start of the 2016–17 NCAA Division I women's basketball season in November. Conference play started in early January 2017 and concluded in March with the 2017 SEC women's basketball tournament at the Bon Secours Wellness Arena in Greenville, South Carolina. The South Carolina Gamecocks were both regular season and tournament champions, with the Mississippi State Bulldogs as runner-up. Both teams received bids to the 2017 NCAA Division I women's basketball tournament and advanced to face each other in the championship, where South Carolina claimed their first-ever national title.

Pre-season

Pre-season All-SEC teams

Coaches select eight players
Players in bold are choices for SEC Player of the Year

Head coaches

Note: Stats shown are before the beginning of the season. Overall and SEC records are from time at current school.

Weekly rankings

Rankings source:

Regular season

Conference matrix
This table summarizes the head-to-head results between teams in conference play.

SEC tournament

The conference tournament was held March 1 through March 5, 2017, at the Bon Secours Wellness Arena in Greenville, South Carolina. Teams were seeded by conference record, with ties broken by record between the tied teams followed by record against the regular-season champion, if necessary.

Postseason

NCAA Division I Women's Basketball tournament

Women's National Invitation tournament

WNBA draft
The 2017 WNBA draft was held on April 13 in New York City. Eight women from the SEC were selected. This is the most draft picks for the SEC since 2008 (10), and the seventh time at least eight players from the league have been drafted. It is the sixth time that the SEC has had at least four first round picks.

SEC draftees

Footnotes

References

 
Southeastern Conference women's basketball seasons